Muddy Run Pumped Storage Facility was built by the Philadelphia Electric Company and is a pumped-storage hydroelectric generation facility in Drumore Township, Pennsylvania, United States.  When completed in 1968, Muddy Run was the largest pumped-storage facility in the world.  The facility is operated by the Susquehanna Electric Company, a subsidiary of Constellation Energy.  Ernest Spey was the superintendent of Conowingo Hydroelectric Dam and the new Muddy Run facility until 1989.

The power house uses excess grid capacity during off peak hours to pump water from the Conowingo Reservoir into the upper reservoir through four  diameter,  vertical shafts. During peak power demand periods, the water is allowed to flow back from the lake through the shafts to the eight turbines causing the pumps to act as generators. Muddy Run has a capacity of 1,071 megawatts.

The Muddy Run electrical machinery was designed by the noted engineer Eugene C. Whitney of Westinghouse Electric Company, who designed the machinery for the Grand Coulee Dam #3 powerhouse.  Whitney "was present when the machines were first to be started. The operator was reluctant to take the first step. Gene said, 'Call your boss.'  The boss said, 'If Gene says to start the machines, start them.' So they did, and water rose from the lower Susquehanna River to the upper reservoir, 400 feet above".

The upper reservoir extends into Martic Township.  The area around the upper reservoir is operated as a park, complementing the nearby Susquehannock State Park.  Susquehannock State Park has an overlook trail with a good view of the Muddy Run facility.

References
 Background

External links 

Exelon's Muddy Run web page
Muddy Run Park

Energy infrastructure completed in 1968
Dams in Pennsylvania
Hydroelectric power plants in Pennsylvania
Buildings and structures in Lancaster County, Pennsylvania
Pumped-storage hydroelectric power stations in the United States
Exelon